Griffith Nanney was the member of the Parliament of England for the constituency of Merioneth (Wales) in 1593.

References 

Members of Parliament for Merioneth
Members of the Parliament of England (pre-1707) for constituencies in Wales
Year of birth missing
Year of death missing